Josip Marošević (born 13 July 1987) is a Croatian football forward.

Club career
Marošević had a spell in Iceland with second tier-outfit Víkingur Ólafsvík and played in the Austrian lower leagues.

References

External links
PrvaLiga profile 

1987 births
Living people
People from Vareš
Association football forwards
Croatian footballers
NK Koprivnica players
Ungmennafélagið Víkingur players
NK Križevci players
HNK Gorica players
NK Zelina players
NK Hrvatski Dragovoljac players
NK Krka players
NK Rudeš players
NK Maksimir players
First Football League (Croatia) players
1. deild karla players
Slovenian PrvaLiga players
Austrian 2. Landesliga players
Croatian expatriate footballers
Expatriate footballers in Iceland
Croatian expatriate sportspeople in Iceland
Expatriate footballers in Slovenia
Croatian expatriate sportspeople in Slovenia
Expatriate footballers in Austria
Croatian expatriate sportspeople in Austria